WaterPartners International was an American nonprofit developmental aid organization tasked with the specific purpose of providing safe drinking water and sanitation to people in developing countries. Founded in 1990, it has since provided safe drinking water and sanitation to more than 200 communities in eight countries – Bangladesh, El Salvador, Ethiopia, Honduras, Guatemala, India, Kenya, and the Philippines. The organization's co-founder and current executive director Gary White is also a founding board member of the Global Water Challenge and Water Advocates.

In July 2009, WaterPartners International merged with H2O Africa to form Water.org, co-founded by Matt Damon and Gary White.

Approach

WaterPartners' approach to implementing water projects involves four key components:
 forging partnerships with local partner organizations in the countries it serves
 involving the community at each stage of the project
 selecting technology appropriate to the local community and their particular situation
 integrating all projects with health and hygiene education.

The organization conducts monitoring, evaluation, and original research programs. It has initiated third-party evaluations of its programs to determine how it is fulfilling its mission.

WaterPartners' stated vision is to work towards providing safe drinking water to everyone in the world. Currently, approximately one in six people on earth lack access to safe source of drinking water. More than two billion people lack access to basic sanitation.

WaterCredit
WaterPartners projects were funded through grants, loans, or a combination of the two. Its loan program is called WaterCredit. It uses the concept of microcredit to fund water sanitation projects.

WaterPartners received grants from organizations such as the PepsiCo Foundation, The Michael and Susan Dell Foundation, and Open Square Foundation (previously called the Agora Foundation).

See also
International development
Water crisis
Water Credit in India
Water supply and sanitation in Bangladesh
Water supply and sanitation in El Salvador
Water supply and sanitation in Ethiopia
Water supply and sanitation in Guatemala
Water supply and sanitation in Honduras
Water supply and sanitation in the Philippines

References

External links
WaterPartners International
World Water Day: A Billion People Worldwide Lack Safe Drinking Water, Larry White, About.com
Michael & Susan Dell Foundation Awards $1 Million Grant to Innovative Nonprofit Solving Global Water Crisis, November 30, 2004.

International charities
Development charities based in the United States
Defunct organizations based in the United States
Organizations established in 1990
Water-related charities